Saint-Amans-de-Pellagal (Languedocien: Sent Amanç de Pelagal) is a commune in the Occitanie region in southern France, in the Tarn-et-Garonne department.

Geography
The Petite Barguelonne forms part of the commune's northern border; the Barguelonne forms most of its southern border.

See also
Communes of the Tarn-et-Garonne department

References

Communes of Tarn-et-Garonne